Rita Maria Walburga Grosse-Ruyken (born 29 November 1948) is a contemporary German artist, sculptor, multimedia installation art, artfilm and performance, producer artist and member of the Association of German Artists Deutscher Kuenstlerbund. The core of her light – sound – space – form installations comprise sculptures in motion made from pure gold and silver. She became internationally known through her exhibition Rays of Light.

Career 
Rita Maria Walburga Grosse-Ruyken was born in Donauwörth, and grew up in a hamlet in the Swabian-Danube region.
From an early age she became aware of natural phenomena and followed phonetic sound bridges.
After Abitur, from 1970 to 1972, she studied Romance and English Language and Literature at the LMU in Munich.

From 1971 to 1977 she studied free art (diploma) and art education (state examination and master's degree) at the Academy of Fine Arts in Munich and dedicated herself to the art of the goldsmith under the guidance of Professor Franz Rickert und Hermann Juenger. She was also influenced by Professor Guenther Fruhtrunk, a constructivist painter as well as by the religious philosopher Aloys Goergen, the president of the Academy.
From 1977 to 1978 she studied art history and archeology at the University of the Sorbonne in Paris.

From 1983 on she has worked freelance dedicating herself to researching the transparency, colour, light and movement of sculptures.
Since 1993, in her continual exchange with astrophysicists, musicians, philosophers, writers, sound technicians and architects, she has been expanding her activities into the performance art and into exploring of Primary Sounds produced by integrated sculptures made from pure gold and pure silver which create motion in and by themselves. Since 2008 she has been involved in the production of art films.

Samples of her work are included in the permanent collections of the International Design Museum, the Pinakothek der Moderne in Munich as well as the Kunstgewerbemuseum Berlin and MAK, Museum Angewandte Kunst (Frankfurt am Main).

Exhibitions

Solo exhibitions (selection) 
 1981: The Prelude to the Round Dance – the Body as Vessel, With a Crown. Light-Form-Installation. Gallery Kröner, Castle Oberrimsingen
 1985–2005: Installation SONNENDUNST – Zyklus I, Landakademie Rattenbach
1993: L'ESPRIT DE DIEU PLANAIT À LA SURFACE DES EAUX, The German contribution to the European City of Culture Antwerp
1994: L'ESPRIT DE DIEU PLANAIT SUR LES EAUX, Light-Form-Space-Installation. Die Neue Sammlung, International Design Museum, Munich
2003: IM GERICHTSSTAND. Licht-Klang-Form-Raum-Installationen. MAK, Museum Angewandte Kunst (Frankfurt am Main)
 2004: DURCHFLUTUNG/RAYS OF LIGHT, Museum of Arts and Design (MAD), New York City & Goethe Institut, New York City
 2009: RAYS OF LIGHT – Rita Grosse-Ruyken, MAK, Museum Angewandte Kunst (Frankfurt am Main)
 2015: DURCHFLUTUNG AND THE WHITE STONE, ArtCOP21 Agenda culturel Paris Climat 2015
2019: The Power of The Heights Command: DURCHFLUTUNG und DER WEISSE STEIN. Blu-ray Disc Projektion, Haselbacher Muehle, Triftern

Group exhibitions (selection) 
 1979: Goldschmiede dieser Zeit. Körper – Schmuck – Zeichen – Raum, Kestnergesellschaft
 1979: Körper – Zeichen, Städtische Galerie im Lenbachhaus, München
 1981: Körper, Schmuck, Zeichen, Raum. Goldschmiedearbeiten, Museum of Design, Zürich
1984: Kirche heute. Architektur und Gerät. Süddeutscher Raum, Die Neue Sammlung, München
 1993: Münchner Goldschmiede. Schmuck und Gerät der Gegenwart, Münchner Stadtmuseum, München
 2004: Welt in Tropfen, (Urania, Berlin)
 2007: Gulf Art Fair, Dubai (Galerie Thomas, München)
 2009: Herbert Hoffmann Award 1973–2008, München
 2011: Ausstellung Pinakothek München
 2011: Modern Contemporary Art, Salwa Zeidan Gallery, Abu Dhabi Art
 2012: Im Zeichen der Ewigkeit. Positionen zeitgenössischer Kunst, Neues Museum Kloster Schussenried
 2012: Quinta Essentia, Deutscher Künstlerbund Berlin
 2013: intimate, Frameless Gallery London
2018: KünstlerINNen. Zeitgenössische Positionen in Verbindung mit historischen Werken, Kunsthaus Burg Obernberg, Austria
2019: ITSLIQUID Group: ALCHEMIC BODY. THE LINE Contemporary Art Space, London
2020: VISION EUROPA. 30 Jahre Kultur und Geschichtsverein Vilshofen. Stadtturm, Vilshofen
2020: DURCHFLUTUNG III / RAYS OF LIGHT III. Danner-Preis 2020/100 Jahre Danner-Stiftung, The Design Museum, Pinakothek der Moderne, München

Exhibition catalogue 
 Sabine Runde (Hrsg.): Transformationen – rays of light ( Mit Beiträgen u.a von Hans Wichmann, Aloys Goergen, André Fischer, Friedrich Piel. Texte in Deutsch und Englisch), Museum für Angewandte Kunst, Frankfurt 2009,

Awards 

 1974: Herbert Hofmann Award
 1976: Benvenuto Cellini Award
 1990: State sponsorship award for young artists and writers in the field of "jewelry of gold and silversmiths"

Art films 

 2013: Performance THE DRAWING FROM THE GOLDEN CHALICE in Abu Dhabi
2014: The Birth of The Golden DURCHFLUTUNG II during 1987-1990
2014: LE SOUFFLE DE DIEU PLANAIT À LA SURFACE DES EAUX about the 1993 performance in Antwerpen
2015: RAYS OF LIGHT, about the 2009 exhibition with the same name
2006-2019: DURCHFLUTUNG und DER WEISSE STEIN: a film with 12 chapters (length: 17,5 hours)
 2018: DER EWIGE QUELL, about the coming "Museum of Visionary Art" in Triftern
2021: Performance DURCHFLUTUNG - DER ERDE at Pinakothek der Moderne, München

External links 
 Website of Rita Grosse-Ruyken
 RAYS OF LIGHT by Rita Grosse-Ruyken, Film on YouTube
 Excerpts of DURCHFLUTUNG and THE WHITE STONE, Video on Vimeo
 Le Souffle de Dieu planait à la Surface des Eaux – Performance in Antwerpen 1993, Video on Vimeo
 The Birth of The Golden DURCHFLUTUNG II / Die Geburt von DURCHFLUTUNG II, Video on Vimeo
 Directory of Association of German Artists Deutscher Künstlerbund (see letter G: Große-Ruyken, Rita M. W.)

References 

German installation artists
1948 births
Living people
German sculptors
German women sculptors
21st-century German women artists